Sleuth may refer to:

Detective
Sleuth, collective noun for a group of bears

Computing
The Sleuth Kit, a collection of forensic analysis software
SLEUTH assembler language for the UNIVAC 1107

Entertainment and media
Cloo, formerly Sleuth, an American cable television channel owned by NBCUniversal
Sleuth (Disney), a fictional Disney character
Sleuth (video game), a 1983 computer game

Theatre and film
The Sleuth (1925 film), a silent era film featuring Stan Laurel
Sleuth (play), a 1970 play by Anthony Shaffer
Sleuth (1972 film), a film adaptation of the Anthony Shaffer play, directed by Joseph L. Mankiewicz
Sleuth (2007 film), a film adaptation of the Anthony Shaffer play, adapted by Harold Pinter and directed by Kenneth Branagh

Vessels
HMAS Sleuth, ships of the Royal Australian Navy
HMS Sleuth (P261), a submarine of the Royal Navy, in service 1944–1958

Other
Sleuth (game), one of the 1960s 3M "gamette" card games